The 2019 NASCAR Racing Experience 300 was a NASCAR Xfinity Series race held on February 16, 2019, Contested over 120 laps, on the  asphalt superspeedway. It was the first race of the 2019 NASCAR Xfinity Series season.

Entry list

Practice

First practice

Final practice

Qualifying

Qualifying results

Race

Race results

Stage Results
Stage One
Laps: 30

Stage Two
Laps: 30

Final Stage Results

Laps: 60

References

NASCAR Racing Experience 300
NASCAR Racing Experience 300
NASCAR races at Daytona International Speedway
2019 NASCAR Xfinity Series